is one of the 100 Famous Japanese Mountains. It lies on the border between Gunma and Niigata prefectures. 

Mountains of Gunma Prefecture
Mountains of Niigata Prefecture